The University of Maryland School of Music (officially abbreviated UM School of Music) is a music school in College Park, Maryland,  outside of Washington, D.C. The School of Music is the largest performing arts unit at the University of Maryland, College Park.

Academics
The UM School of Music is a comprehensive music school, with undergraduate and graduate programs areas of study. The school offers the following degrees: Doctor of Philosophy (PhD), Doctor of Musical Arts (DMA), Master of Music (MM), Master of Arts (MA), Bachelor of Music (BM), Bachelor of Music Education (BME), and Bachelor of Arts (BA). Specializations within these degrees include composition, conducting, music education, music history & literature, music theory, and performance (piano, string, voice & opera, wind & percussion, jazz).

Academically, the UM School of Music is a constituent of the university's College of Arts & Humanities. Logistically, the School is a resident of the university's Clarice Smith Performing Arts Center, a  facility completed in 2001.

The National Orchestral Institute is a program of the UM School of Music.

History
From the time when UM was still Maryland Agricultural College, student bands and choirs and military bands have existed on campus. The Department of Music was founded in 1954 and accredited by the National Association of Schools of Music in 1966. In 1995 the Board of Regents approves the re-designation of the Department of Music as the UM School of Music.

References

External links 
 UM School of Music – official website

Music schools in Maryland
School of Music
Universities and colleges in Prince George's County, Maryland